The Suwannee County Courthouse (constructed in 1904) is a historic government building located at 200 South Ohio Avenue on the southwest corner of Warren Street in Live Oak, Florida. On November 12, 1998, it was added to the U.S. National Register of Historic Places.

References

External links
 Suwannee County History, Suwannee County Clerk of the Court
 Suwannee County Courthouse, Florida's Historic Courthouses
 Florida's Historic Courthouses by Hampton Dunn
 Suwannee County Courthouse in Florida's Historic Courthouses

County courthouses in Florida
Courthouses on the National Register of Historic Places in Florida
Buildings and structures in Suwannee County, Florida
Clock towers in Florida
Towers in Florida
National Register of Historic Places in Suwannee County, Florida
Government buildings completed in 1904
1904 establishments in Florida